Tower of the Koutoubia Mosque is an oil on canvas painting of the Kutubiyya Mosque in Marrakesh by Winston Churchill. The painting, the only one Churchill undertook during the Second World War, was completed on 25/26 January 1943, during a visit to the city by Churchill and President Franklin D. Roosevelt, following the Casablanca Conference. Churchill subsequently presented the picture to Roosevelt. It was later owned by Angelina Jolie. At its sale in 2021 the picture was described by Christie's as "Churchill's most important work" and achieved the highest ever auction price for a painting by Churchill.

History

Churchill had first visited Morocco in the winter of 1935-1936. Disappointed by constant rain in Tangier over Christmas, he relocated to the city of Marrakech for the New Year. Despite initial reservations; “the crowds, the smells and the general discomfort for painting have repelled me”; he stayed for three weeks and came to love the city he termed ‘The Paris of the Sahara’. Finding it conducive both to work and to painting, he wrote to his wife, Clementine, recording the newspaper articles and book chapters dictated, and the seven pictures completed among “brilliant sunshine, translucent air and swarms of picturesque inhabitants”. After the Casablanca Conference, some seven years later, he persuaded an initially reluctant Roosevelt to accompany him on a trip to Marrakech. Here, on 25/26 January 1943, he painted Tower of the Koutoubia Mosque. Churchill worked on the picture from the balcony of the city's Villa Taylor, where he and Roosevelt had stayed. Martin Gilbert, in the 7th volume of his authorised biography, Road To Victory: Winston S. Churchill: 1941-1945, records it as "the only picture he painted during the whole war". Churchill himself described the event in the fourth volume of his memoirs of the Second World War, The Hinge of Fate; “I returned to the Villa Taylor, where I spent another two days in correspondence with the War Cabinet about my future movements, and painting from the tower the only picture I ever attempted during the war.” Tower of the Koutoubia Mosque was later given to President Roosevelt as a birthday present.

The painting was inherited by Roosevelt's son Elliot who sold it to George W. Woodward of Nebraska in 1950. It was purchased by Norman G. Hickman of New York in 1964. Hickman was a financier, collector and film producer, who had worked on The Finest Hours, a documentary on Churchill’s life. During Hickman’s ownership, the painting was exhibited at the National Churchill Museum at Fulton, Missouri. It remained in his family's ownership until it was placed with M.S. Rau Antiques of New Orleans in 2011. It was then bought by the actress Angelina Jolie.

In March 2021, the painting was sold by Jolie at a Christie's auction for £8.285 million, a record for a painting by Churchill. It was described by Christie’s as "Churchill's most important work". The previous record price for a picture by Churchill was £1.765 million, achieved in 2014 for The Goldfish Pool at Chartwell (1932).

Description
The painting is oil on canvas, is 20" high and 24" wide, and bears Churchill's initials. It depicts a distant view of the Marrakesh medina, with the city walls in the middle-distance, the Bab Doukkala gate to the left, with the minaret of the Bab Doukkala Mosque behind, the Kutubiyya Mosque to the right, and the Atlas Mountains in the background. The picture is recorded as No.381 in the catalogue raisonné, Churchill: his paintings, prepared by the art historian David Coombs after Churchill's death and published in 1967.

Notes

References

Sources

External links
 Andrew Marr on the painting in his programme - Churchill: Blood, Sweat and Oil Paint
 Andrew Marr on Churchill’s painting in Marrakesh in his programme - Churchill: Blood, Sweat and Oil Paint

1943 paintings
Winston Churchill
Marrakesh